The Xinzhuang Culture and Arts Center is an art and cultural center in Xinzhuang District, New Taipei, Taiwan.

History
The preparation for the center started in 1990. In 1991–1992, the center committee observed features from various cultural centers around Taiwan to get the idea of the center features before starting the construction. The construction of the center took 1 year and 10 months and the center was opened on 11 November 2005.

Architecture
Front side of the center features an open space for public. The building has 3 floors and 1 underground floor. The center is divided into the art hall, performing hall, periodical room, reading room and Xinzhuang hand puppet hall The center is equipped with information center and gift shop.

Transportation
The center is accessible within walking distance southeast of Taishan Station of Taoyuan Airport MRT.

See also
 List of tourist attractions in Taiwan

References

External links
 

2005 establishments in Taiwan
Art centers in New Taipei
Event venues established in 2005
Cultural centers in Taiwan